The 2019–20 season was the 110th season of competitive football in Germany.

Promotion and relegation

Pre-season

Post-season

National teams

Germany national football team

Kits

UEFA Euro 2020 qualifying

UEFA Euro 2020 qualifying Group C

UEFA Euro 2020 qualifying fixtures and results

Friendly matches

Germany women's national football team

Kits

UEFA Women's Euro 2022 qualifying

UEFA Women's Euro 2022 qualifying Group I

UEFA Women's Euro 2022 qualifying fixtures and results

2020 Algarve Cup

Friendly matches

League season

Men

Bundesliga

Bundesliga standings

2. Bundesliga

2. Bundesliga standings

3. Liga

3. Liga standings

DFB-Pokal

Final

DFL-Supercup

Women

Frauen-Bundesliga

Bundesliga standings

2. Frauen-Bundesliga

2. Bundesliga standings

DFB-Pokal (women)

Final

German clubs in Europe

UEFA Champions League

Group stage

Group B

Group D

Group F

Group G

Knockout phase

Round of 16

|}

Quarter-finals

|}

Semi-finals

|}

Final

The "home" team (for administrative purposes) was determined by an additional draw held on 10 July 2020 (after the quarter-final and semi-final draws), at the UEFA headquarters in Nyon, Switzerland.

UEFA Europa League

Qualifying phase and play-off round

Second qualifying round

|}

Third qualifying round

|}

Play-off round

|}

Group stage

Group F

Group I

Group J

Knockout phase

Round of 32

|}

Round of 16

|}

Quarter-finals

|}

UEFA Women's Champions League

Knockout phase

Round of 32

|}

Round of 16

|}

Quarter-finals

|}

Semi-finals

|}

Final

Notes

References

 
Seasons in German football